Black Christmas (originally titled Silent Night, Evil Night in the United States and retitled Stranger in the House on television screenings) is a 1974 Canadian slasher film produced and directed by Bob Clark, and written by A. Roy Moore. It stars Olivia Hussey, Keir Dullea, Margot Kidder, Andrea Martin, Lynne Griffin and John Saxon. The story follows a group of sorority sisters who receive threatening phone calls and are eventually stalked and murdered by a deranged killer during the Christmas season.

Inspired by the urban legend "the babysitter and the man upstairs" and a series of murders that took place in the Westmount neighbourhood of Montreal, Quebec, Moore wrote the screenplay under the title Stop Me. The filmmakers made numerous alterations to the script, primarily the shifting to a university setting with young adult characters. It was shot in Toronto in 1974 on an estimated budget of $686,000, and was distributed by Warner Bros. in North America.

Upon its release, Black Christmas received mixed reviews, but it has since received critical re-appraisal, with film historians noting it for being one of the earliest slasher films. It is also praised for its influence on John Carpenter's Halloween (1978). Aside from its earning a cult following since its release, a novelization written by Lee Hays was published in 1976. It is the first film in the Black Christmas series, being followed by two remakes in 2006 and  2019. The film has since received retroactive recognition and has been regarded as one of the greatest horror films ever made.

Plot

An unseen man climbs the exterior of a sorority house, where a Christmas party is being held, and enters the attic. The house phone rings, and Jess Bradford answers to discover it is an obscene phone call from a person who has called before, known as "The Moaner". Jess and the other sorority girls listen as the caller rants, moans, and screams in strange voices. Barb, an inebriated student, antagonizes the caller, who in turn threatens to kill her in a sudden low tone. A younger student, Clare Harrison, suggests that the caller could be a rapist before returning to her bedroom to pack her suitcase. Shortly thereafter, Mrs. MacHenry, the housemother, arrives. As Clare packs her things upstairs, she fails to notice the intruder hiding behind a plastic dress bag. Clare hears Mrs. MacHenry's cat, Claude, meowing from the closet and slowly approaches it, only to be suffocated with the plastic dress bag. As the party wraps up, the killer carries Clare's body into the attic and places her into a rocking chair by the attic window.

The following morning, Clare's father arrives to take her home for Christmas break, but she fails to show up. Mrs. MacHenry assumes Clare went to the fraternity house for a party, and helps Mr. Harrison look for her. Later that day, Jess informs her boyfriend, Peter, that she is pregnant and plans to undergo an abortion. Angered, Peter insists they continue this discussion later that night. In town, Mr. Harrison, Barb, and Phyl attempt to report Clare as missing to Sergeant Nash, who does not take them seriously until Chris Hayden, Clare's boyfriend, barges in angrily later that night and demands something be done about Clare's disappearance. At the police station, they learn that a high school girl, Janice Quaife, has also vanished.

After putting a drunken Barb to bed, Mr. Harrison, Chris, Jess, and Phyl help search for Janice. Meanwhile, Mrs. MacHenry discovers Clare's body before the killer releases a crane hook that impales and kills her. In the park, Janice's disfigured body is found by the police. Jess answers another obscene phone call and decides to file a report with the police, only for Peter to surprise her. He attempts to persuade her into marriage, but she refuses and reaffirms her decision to have an abortion. As Peter leaves angrily, Lieutenant Fuller arrives with a telephone lineman to tap the phone.

Jess hears Barb having an asthma attack and rushes to her room; Barb claims that she had a nightmare that a man walked into her room. After calming her down, Jess hears Christmas Carolers at the front door and leaves Barb unattended. The killer walks into Barb's room and stabs her to death with a glass unicorn figurine; her cries for help are drowned out by the caroling. Jess experiences another unnerving phone call, in which the caller emulates her argument with Peter. Lieutenant Fuller calls her to say the attempt to trace the call failed, and theorizes that Peter could be responsible, but Jess doubts this. After Jess and Phyl are spooked by a couple of search party members, they set out and lock up every door and window in the house. Phyl sees Barb's door close, and goes to check in on her, only for her to be killed off-screen.

Jess receives one final phone call in which the killer alludes to some sort of transgression between two children named Agnes and Billy. The call is long enough to be traced, and Sergeant Nash instructs Jess to leave the house immediately, as the calls are coming from within the house. Concerned for Barb and Phyl, she ventures upstairs, where she discovers their bodies. Jess sees the killer's eye through a door crack as he slowly begins to close it on her; she slams the door against him and runs downstairs, not before the killer grabs Jess by her long hair in which she screams out, and flees into the basement and locks it shut as the killer bangs on it. She then hears footsteps walking away and (presumably) the front door opening. However, when she walks downstairs into the basement, Jess sees Peter peek through a window and call her name; he breaks a window and enters the basement as he calls her name worriedly. Once Peter finds her, he begins to approach her as she backs away and clutches the fire poker.

The police arrive and hear Jess screaming; they discover her barely conscious in the basement with Peter's bloody body next to her. Believing that Peter was the killer, they put Jess to bed, sedated, in her room and leave her alone in the house, with a police officer standing outside. The killer's voice is heard from the attic, and a shadow is seen descending the attic's ladder, implying that he is still alive. The still-undiscovered bodies of Clare and Mrs. MacHenry are seen through the attic window before the house's telephone begins to ring.

Cast

Production

Development
Black Christmas was initially developed by Canadian screenwriter Roy Moore, who wrote the screenplay under the title Stop Me. Inspirations for the film came from the urban legend known as "The Babysitter and the Man Upstairs", which had become widespread during the 1970s. Moore also claimed to have been inspired by a series of murders that occurred during the holiday season in the Westmount area of Montreal. As noted in an article for The Telegraph, the murders, which occurred in 1943, were perpetrated by a fourteen-year-old boy who bludgeoned several of his family members to death.
Film producers Harvey Sherman and Richard Schouten had Timothy Bond rewrite the script to give it a university setting. Clark, who had felt the original script was too much of a straightforward slasher film, made several alterations in dialogue, and also incorporated humorous elements into the film, particularly the drunkenness of Barb, and Mrs. Mac, who Clark based on his aunt. Clark felt that college and high school students had not been depicted with "any sense of reality" in American film, and that he intended to capture the "astuteness" of young adults: "College students—even in 1974—are astute people. They're not fools. It's not all 'bikinis, beach blankets, [and] bingo'".

Casting

Olivia Hussey, who had previously garnered international fame for her role as Juliet in Franco Zeffirelli's Romeo and Juliet (1968), signed on to appear in the film after being told by a psychic that she would "make a film in Canada that would earn a great deal of money". Clark sought Keir Dullea to play the role of Peter based on his performance as Dave Bowman in 2001: A Space Odyssey (1968). The role of Mrs. Mac was offered to Bette Davis, who declined the part. Margot Kidder was cast in the role of Barb, and said she had been attracted to the character "because she was wild and out of control", and not a "conventional leading" part. For the role of Clare Harrison, whose murder jump-starts the film's plot, Toronto native Lynne Griffin was cast after her mother, who was also her casting agent at the time, got her an audition. Griffin would later go on to star in Curtains (1983), and in the acclaimed television series Wind at My Back (1996–2001).

Gilda Radner was offered the role of Phyllis Carlson. She accepted the part, but dropped out one month before filming began owing to Saturday Night Live commitments, and was replaced by Andrea Martin. The role of Lieutenant Fuller was originally given to Edmond O'Brien. Upon his arrival to the set, however, the producers realized he would be unable to fulfill the duties required of the part due to his failing health (stemming from Alzheimer's disease). John Saxon, who had read the script prior, was called by the producers who offered him the role. He accepted, and had to arrive in Toronto from New York City within two days to begin shooting. For the role of the film's antagonist, Italian-Canadian actor Nick Mancuso was cast as one of the main voices in the phone call sequences. When auditioning for the role, director Clark had Mancuso sit in a chair facing away from him, so as not to see the actor's face. Clark then had Mancuso experiment with different voices in order to come up with one that was right for the character, with Clark later offering him the part.

John Saxon had appeared in the first giallo.

Filming

The film was shot from 25 March to 11 May 1974, at a cost of $686,000, with $200,000 coming from the Canadian Film Development Corporation. The house featured in the film had been discovered by Clark while scouting for locations, and its owners agreed to lease the home for the production. Additional photography was completed on the University of Toronto campus. According to John Saxon, Clark had meticulously drawn out storyboards with key shots, which he brought to the film set each day: "I could understand exactly what I thought he needed, and the scene needed". Scenes in the film involving POV shot of Billy scaling the house was accomplished through the use of a rig designed by camera operator Bert Dunk, which was attached to Dunk's head as he climbed up the side of the house. Griffin's death scene, which was shot with a handheld camera in a real closet, was accomplished in only a couple of takes. According to Griffin, her character's surprise as the killer lunges from the closet was genuine as the actress later recalled: "It was a total shock because I didn't really know when to expect him to jump out!" Shots of Clare's corpse in the rocking chair required the actress to wear an actual plastic bag over her head for extended periods of time. Griffin would also state that these scenes came relatively easy for her: "I was actually, and still am, a fairly good swimmer so I could hold my breath for a long time. And I could also keep my eyes open for a long time without blinking".

Margot Kidder remembered shooting the film as being "fun. I really bonded with Andrea Martin, filming in Toronto and Ontario. Olivia Hussey was a bit of an odd one. She was obsessed with the idea of falling in love with Paul McCartney through her psychic. We were a little hard on her for things like that".

Post-production
The composer of the film's score, Carl Zittrer, stated in an interview that he created the film's mysterious music by tying forks, combs, and knives onto the strings of the piano to warp the sound of the keys. Zittrer also stated that he would distort the sound further by recording its sound onto an audiotape and make the sound slower. The audio for the disturbing phone calls was performed by multiple actors including Mancuso and director Bob Clark. Mancuso stated in an interview that he stood on his head during the recording sessions to compress his thorax and make his voice sound more demented. Mancuso spent only three days recording dialogue for the character, later recalling the experience as being very "avant-garde", with Clark encouraging him to improvise with the character's voice.

During preparation in 1975 for the film's American release, Warner Bros. studio executives asked Clark to change the concluding scene to show Clare's boyfriend, Chris, appear in front of Jess and say, "Agnes, don't tell them what we did" before killing her. However, Clark insisted on keeping the ending ambiguous. The original title of the film was initially planned to be Stop Me. Clark has stated in an interview that he came up with the film's official title, saying that he enjoyed the irony of a dark event occurring during a festive holiday. According to Clark as well, Warner Bros. changed the title to Silent Night, Evil Night for the United States theatrical release.

Release

Theatrical distribution
Black Christmas was distributed in Canada by Ambassador Film Distributors and released in Toronto on 11 October 1974. The film grossed $143,000 from nine theatres in Toronto in its first two weeks and earned $1.3 million during its theatrical run in Canada. Warner Bros. believed that the film would earn at least $7 million in the United States. The film was released on 20 December, but only earned $284,345 during its theatrical run due to competition from The Godfather Part II and The Man with the Golden Gun. For its American release the film was retitled to Silent Night, Evil Night due to fears that the original title would mislead audiences into believing the film was a blaxploitation movie. They retracted the title after the initial release, restoring it to Black Christmas for subsequent screenings.

Warner Bros. rereleased the film in Los Angeles in August 1975, and it earned $86,340 in one week. Its theatrical run was extended to nineteen theatres. The film's successful run in Los Angeles and Chicago resulted in Warner Bros. expanding the film to seventy theatres for Halloween. However, the film only made $354,990 from those theatres, worth $700 per theatre per day, causing fifty-eight of the locations to cancel their bookings. The film ended its theatrical run in December after making less than $1 million that year.

The film was the third-highest-grossing Canadian film of all time in Canada with a gross of $2 million, behind The Apprenticeship of Duddy Kravitz (1974) and the French language Deux femmes en or (1970), directed by Claude Fournier.

Television premiere controversy
The film, under the title Stranger in the House, was set to make its network television premiere on Saturday night, January 28, 1978, on NBC's weekly "Saturday Night at the Movies". Two weeks prior to its premiere, the Chi Omega sorority house on the campus of Florida State University in Tallahassee was the scene of a double murder in which two Chi Omega sisters, asleep in their beds, were bludgeoned to death. The killer then went to a nearby room in the sorority house and violently attacked two more sleeping co-eds, who survived. The killer was later identified as Ted Bundy, who was executed for this and other homicides on January 24, 1989.

A few days before the film was set to premiere on network television Florida's then-Governor Reubin Askew contacted NBC President Robert Mullholland to request the movie not be shown due to its all-too-similar theme as the murders of sorority sisters by an unknown madman at the Chi Omega Sorority House. On Tuesday, January 24, NBC-TV gave several of its affiliates in Florida, Georgia, and Alabama, the option of showing an alternate film, Doc Savage: The Man of Bronze, in place of Stranger in the House.

The report revealed that "the network said in a statement issued yesterday in New York City that it was responding to concern voiced by the affiliates because of the murder of two coeds this month in a sorority house at Florida State University in Tallahassee".

Critical response
During its initial release, the film had garnered mixed reviews. A. H. Weiler of The New York Times called it "a whodunit that raises the question as to why was it made". Variety called the film "a bloody, senseless kill-for-kicks feature, [that] exploits unnecessary violence in a university sorority house operated by an implausibly alcoholic ex-hoofer. Its slow-paced, murky tale involves an obscene telephone caller who apparently delights in killing the girls off one by one, even the hapless house-mother". Gene Siskel of the Chicago Tribune gave the film 1.5 stars out of 4 and called it a "routine shocker" that "is notable only for indicating the kind of junk roles that talented actresses are forced to play in the movies". Kevin Thomas of the Los Angeles Times wrote: "Before it maddeningly overreaches in a gratuitously evasive ending, Black Christmas (opening today at selected theaters) is a smart, stylish Canadian-made little horror picture that is completely diverting ... It may well be that its makers simply couldn't figure out how to end it".

Later reviews have been more positive. On Rotten Tomatoes, Black Christmas holds an approval rating of 71% based on 34 reviews, with an average rating of 6.26/10. The website's critics consensus reads: "The rare slasher with enough intelligence to wind up the tension between bloody outbursts, Black Christmas offers fiendishly enjoyable holiday viewing for genre fans". On Metacritic the film has a weighted average score of 65 out of 100, based on nine critics, indicating "generally favorable reviews".

Heidi Martinuzzi of Film Threat called the film "innovative" and praised the leading actresses, Olivia Hussey and Margot Kidder. TV Guide awarded the film three out of four stars, writing: "Although strictly standard fare, the material is elevated somewhat through Clark's skillful handling of such plot devices as obscene phone calls from the killer to the girls via the upstairs phone and a nicely handled twist ending, which provides a genuine shock".
Author and film critic Leonard Maltin gave the film two and a half out of four stars calling it "bizarre" but also praised Kidder's performance as a standout. The Time Out film guide noted that the film "manages a good slice of old-fashioned suspense".

Home media
Black Christmas has been released on DVD several times in North America. A 25th Anniversary edition was released in Canada on November 6, 2001 by Critical Mass. This edition only contains the theatrical trailer as a bonus feature. The following year, on December 3, 2002, Critical Mass released a Collector's Edition of the film on DVD with making-of documentaries, two audio commentary tracks, and reversible English and French cover artwork.

On December 5, 2006, Critical Mass released a third "Special Edition" DVD with a newly remastered transfer, two original scenes with newly-uncovered vocal tracks, a new documentary on the making of the film, and cast and crew interviews. This edition was later released on Blu-ray on November 11, 2008.

Anchor Bay released a Blu-ray and DVD in Canada, titled the "Season's Grievings Edition". It contains the same transfer of the film as the "Special Edition" release and all previous bonus content, plus the addition of a new documentary ("Black Christmas Legacy"), a 40th-anniversary panel from Fan Expo 2014, a new commentary track featuring Nick Mancuso as the character "Billy", a new retrospective booklet written by Rue Morgue Magazine, and new packaging art by Gary Pullin (art director of Rue Morgue Magazine). This new edition was released on Blu-ray and DVD on November 24, 2015.

In the United States, Scream Factory released the film in a collector's edition Blu-ray on December 13, 2016, with a new transfer and new extras. The Scream Factory release collates all of the bonus materials from the previous releases by Critical Mass and Anchor Bay, and also features the 2006 Critical Mass restoration of the film in the bonus materials. Scream Factory also released the film in a collector's edition 4K Ultra HD + Blu-ray on December 6, 2022. Unlike the previous home media releases and like the 1986 U.S. VHS release from Warner Home Video, the collector's edition 4K Ultra HD + Blu-ray release (Disc 1 and 2) featured the Warner Bros. logo at the beginning and end of the film.

Accolades
Saturn Award-Academy of Science Fiction, Fantasy & Horror Films
 1976: Nominated, Best Horror Film

Canadian Film Awards
 1975: Won, Best Sound Editing in a Feature – Kenneth Heeley-Ray
 1975: Won, Best Performance by a Lead Actress – Margot Kidder
 1975: Nominee, Best Feature Film

Edgar Allan Poe Awards
 1976: Nominated, Best Motion Picture – A. Roy Moore

Legacy
Black Christmas eventually gained a cult following, and is notable for being one of the earliest slasher films. It went on to inspire other slasher films, the biggest one of all being John Carpenter's Halloween (which was apparently inspired by Clark suggesting what a Black Christmas sequel would be like).

Black Christmas has been included in multiple lists in various media outlets as one of the greatest horror films ever made. The film ranked No. 87 on Bravo's The 100 Scariest Movie Moments. It was ranked at No. 67 in IndieWires The 100 Best Horror Movies of All Time, its entry stating that "the plot sounds formulaic, but Black Christmas remains timeless thanks to its terrifying and elusive killer, 'Billy', whose backstory is never revealed, as well as a foreboding ending that doesn't offer much hope for the film's Final Girl". Thrillist's Scott Weinberg, in his article The 75 Best Horror Movies of All Time, ranked the film at No. 48. Paul Schrodt of Esquire placed the film at No. 23 in his list of the 50 Best Horror Films of All Time. In 2017, Complex magazine named Black Christmas the 2nd-best slasher film of all time. The following year, Paste listed it the 3rd-best slasher film of all time, while also placing the character Jess Bradford at #1 in their list of "20 Best 'Final Girls' in Horror Movie History". While director Clark maintained he did not intend for the film to have political leanings, critics have noted Black Christmas is nonetheless a feminist film for its treatment of female characters—particularly Jess having agency and making the choice to have an abortion—and its portrayal of casual misogyny (as when the police initially fail to take the sorority's concerns about the phone calls and Clare's absence seriously). Film critic Tim Dirks of the film-review website Filmsite.org added the film to his list of films featuring the "Greatest Film Plot Twists, Film Spoilers and Surprise Endings", based on the film's major plot twists – the revelation that the real killer was hidden inside the unsearched attic, and Jess' implied murder.

Olivia Hussey told Bravo during an interview about their 100 Scariest Movie Moments series, that when she met Steve Martin for the first time, he told her that she starred in one of his favorite films of all time. Hussey initially thought he was referring to Romeo and Juliet, but was surprised when Martin said it was Black Christmas and that he had seen the film 27 times.

Related works

Novelization
A novelization of the film written by Lee Hays was published in 1976 by Popular Library. The book follows roughly the same plot, but sticks with Roy Moore's original script. Because of this, the novel ends up fleshing out the characters more, adding scenes and lines of dialogue that were initially cut from the film's final script, and giving the Pi Kappa Sigma property more backstory.

It's Me Billy: Black Christmas Revisited
A book chronicling the behind the scenes making of the original film (as well as time given to the remakes), was made available in 2022. The book features new interviews with original cast members and more, and was written by author Paul Downey of Bloody-Flicks and filmmaker Dave Hastings.

Remakes

Black Christmas has been remade on two separate occasions, with the films differing significantly from the original.

The first remake was directed by Glen Morgan and was released on December 25, 2006. It is loosely based on the original film, containing more graphic content and a focus into the past of Billy. Andrea Martin was the only original cast member to appear in the film, and Bob Clark served as an executive producer.

The second remake was made by Blumhouse Productions, directed and written by Sophia Takal, co-written by April Wolfe and produced by Jason Blum. Starring Imogen Poots and Cary Elwes, the film was released on December 13, 2019.

It's Me, Billy: A Black Christmas Fan Film
A short fan film funded through an Indiegogo campaign was released on YouTube and Vimeo with the title It's Me, Billy, in May 2021. It is billed as an "unofficial sequel" to the original film and picks up the story 50 years later, following the granddaughter of Jess Bradford. The film was written, produced, and directed by Dave McRae and Bruce Dale and acts as a concept for a feature film as well as the first part of a two-part story. The film is available for free. It's Me, Billy was nominated for Best Cinematography in the Dramatic Short category at the 65th annual CSC (Canadian Society of Cinematographers) awards.

See also
 List of films featuring home invasions
 Holiday horror
 List of films set around Christmas

References

Works cited

External links

 
 
 
 

Black Christmas (film series)
1970s Canadian films
1970s Christmas horror films
1970s English-language films
1970s exploitation films
1970s pregnancy films
1970s serial killer films
1970s slasher films
1974 films
1974 horror films
1974 independent films
Canadian Christmas horror films
Canadian exploitation films
Canadian independent films
Canadian pregnancy films
Canadian serial killer films
Canadian slasher films
English-language Canadian films
Films about abortion
Films about fraternities and sororities
Films about fratricide and sororicide
Films about telephony
Films based on urban legends
Films directed by Bob Clark
Films set in the United States
Films shot from the first-person perspective
Films shot in Toronto
Home invasions in film
Warner Bros. films